David Oldfield may refer to:

David Oldfield (footballer) (born 1978), Australian-born English association footballer
David Oldfield (politician) (born 1958), Australian politician
Dave Oldfield (1864–1939), baseball player